The 20th Lumières Awards ceremony, presented by the Académie des Lumières, was held on 2 February 2015, at the Espace Pierre Cardin in Paris. Nominations were announced on 12 January 2015. Saint Laurent garnered the most nominations with a total of five. Timbuktu, La Famille Bélier and  Love at First Fight won two awards each.

Winners and nominees

Films with multiple nominations and awards

The following films received multiple nominations:

The following films received multiple awards:

See also

 40th César Awards
 5th Magritte Awards

References

External links

 
 
 20th Lumières Awards at AlloCiné

Lumières Awards
Lumières
Lumières